Bob Carr (born 1947) is the former Premier of New South Wales, Australia.

Bob Carr may also refer to:

Milton Robert Carr (born 1943), commonly known as Bob Carr, U.S. Representative from the state of Michigan
Bob Carr (archaeologist) (born 1947), American archaeologist
Bob Carr (Florida politician), former mayor of Orlando, Florida, namesake of the Bob Carr Performing Arts Centre

See also
Robert Carr (disambiguation)